Wattenberg or Wattenburg may refer to:

Places 
 Wattenberg, Austria
 Wattenberg (Habichtswald), a mountain in Hesse, Germany
 Wattenberg, Colorado, also spelled Wattenburg, in the United States
 Wattenberg Gas Field, United States

Other 
 Wattenberg (surname), a list of people with the surname